Colac (Il Collaccio) is a mountain in the Dolomites of Italy. The mountain is located in the north of the province of Trentino near the ski resort of Canazei. At  it is the highest summit of the Colac-Buffaure subgroup that forms part of the Marmolada group.

The mountain saw few visitors until the Via Ferrata dei Finanzieri was established. A cable car runs from Penia to the Ciampac meadows directly at the base of the mountain.

References

External links
SummitPost.org - Colac
Via Ferrata dei Finanzieri

Mountains of Trentino
Mountains of the Alps
Dolomites